Alayaron (English: The Dawn) is one of the first Bodo feature movies. It was released on 13 March 1986 at Ganga Talkies, Kokrajhar. The film was directed by Jwngdao Bodosa from a screenplay by Nilkamal Brahma and Hiramba Narzary. The story is based upon the short story Mwdwi Arw Gwlwmdwi, which is published Sirinai Mandar in 1985 written by Brahma himself. The movie stars Amar Narzary and Rohila Brahma in leading roles.

The film garnered the 33rd National Film Awards in 1986, for Best Feature Film in Bodo.

Soundtrack
The lyrics of the songs were written by Mahini Narzary and composed by himself. The songs were sung by Sulekha Basumatary and Arun Narzary.

See also
Bodo films
Bodo language

References

1986 films
Bodo-language films
Best Bodo Film National Film Award winners